Syarizad "Sherry" Ibrahim is a Malaysian actress, model and television host. She was born in Petaling Jaya, Selangor. In 2013, she played the lead character Iffa in the Malaysian series Teduhan Kasih.

Early life

Sherry was born and raised in Petaling Jaya to Ibrahim Yaacob and Norliza Maamun. She has two younger sisters. As a student, Sherry attended St. Mary's Girls' School, Kuala Lumpur. In 2001, she worked as a flight attendant for Malaysia Airlines. She quit when her contract ended in 2006. She debuted in a TV series in TV3, Dunia Baru, under director M. Hitler Zami, followed by various appearances in acting, hosting and commercials. In 2010, she paused her acting career and took a position as a flight attendant for Qatar Airways.

Career

After a break in her artistic career in 2010, she made a comeback in 2012 when her contract with Qatar Airways ended. She was offered a small role in the drama series Setia Hujung Nyawa from episode 16 onwards at TV3 Malaysia. Sherry was then offered one of the lead roles alongside Adi Putra, Nabila Huda and Shah Iskandar in the drama Teduhan Kasih. She is now managed by Afeeq of Laugh Out Loud Entertainment Sdn. Bhd.

Personal life 
Sherry had a relationship with the Malaysian actor and model, Ashraf Muslim, until early 2009. In October 2014, it was reported that she was having a relationship with a Malaysian actor and model, Fattah Amin. The couple met last June during the drama series of Cinta Ibadah.

Filmography

Film

Drama (TV series)

Telemovie

TV Host

Music video

TV commercials

Discography

Music video

References

External links
 
 
 
 

Living people
Malaysian people of Malay descent
People from Kuala Lumpur
21st-century Malaysian actresses
Malaysian television personalities
Malaysian Muslims
Malaysian film actresses
Malaysian television actresses
Year of birth missing (living people)